In logic, the law of identity states that each thing is identical with itself. It is the first of the historical three laws of thought, along with the law of noncontradiction, and the law of excluded middle. However, few systems of logic are built on just these laws.

History

Ancient philosophy
The earliest recorded use of the law appears to occur in Plato's dialogue Theaetetus (185a), wherein Socrates attempts to establish that what we call "sounds" and "colours" are two different classes of thing:

It is used explicitly only once in Aristotle, in a proof in the Prior Analytics:

Medieval philosophy
Aristotle believed the law of non-contradiction to be the most fundamental law. Both Thomas Aquinas (Met. IV, lect. 6) and Duns Scotus (Quaest. sup. Met. IV, Q. 3) follow Aristotle in this respect. Antonius Andreas, the Spanish disciple of Scotus (d. 1320), argues that the first place should belong to the law "Every Being is a Being" (Omne Ens est Ens, Qq. in Met. IV, Q. 4), but the late scholastic writer Francisco Suárez (Disp. Met. III, § 3) disagreed, also preferring to follow Aristotle.

Another possible allusion to the same principle may be found in the writings of Nicholas of Cusa (1431–1464) where he says:

Modern philosophy
Gottfried Wilhelm Leibniz claimed that the law of identity, which he expresses as "Everything is what it is", is the first primitive truth of reason which is affirmative, and the law of noncontradiction is the first negative truth (Nouv. Ess. IV, 2, § i), arguing that "the statement that a thing is what it is, is prior to the statement that it is not another thing" (Nouv. Ess. IV, 7, § 9). Wilhelm Wundt credits Gottfried Leibniz with the symbolic formulation, "A is A". Leibniz's Law is a similar principle, that if two objects have all the same properties, they are in fact one and the same: Fx and Fy iff x = y.

John Locke (Essay Concerning Human Understanding IV. vii. iv. ("Of Maxims") says:

Hamilton was one of the last to dedicate much to the "three laws"

Afrikan Spir proclaims the law of identity as the fundamental law of knowledge, which is opposed to the changing appearance of the empirical reality.

George Boole, in the introduction to his treatise The Laws of Thought made the following observation with respect to the nature of language and those principles that must inhere naturally within them, if they are to be intelligible:

Objectivism, the philosophy founded by novelist Ayn Rand, is grounded in the law of identity, "A is A". In the objectivism of Ayn Rand the law of identity is used with the concept existence to deduce that that which exists is something. Logic in objectivist epistemology is based on the three laws of logic.

Contemporary philosophy

Analytic
In the Foundations of Arithmetic, Gottlob Frege associated the number one with the property of being self identical. Frege's paper "On Sense and Reference" begins with a discussion on equality and meaning. Frege wondered how a true statement of the form "a = a", a trivial instance of the law of identity, could be different from a true statement of the form "a = b",  a genuine extension of knowledge, if the meaning of a term was its referent.

Bertrand Russell in "On Denoting" has this similar puzzle: "If a is identical with b, whatever is true of the one is true of the other, and either may be substituted for the other without altering the truth or falsehood of that proposition. Now George IV wished to know whether Scott was the author of Waverley; and in fact Scott was the author of Waverley. Hence we may substitute “Scott” for “the author of Waverley” and thereby prove that George IV wished to know whether Scott was Scott. Yet an interest in the law of identity can hardly be attributed to the first gentleman of Europe.”

In the formal logic of analytical philosophy, the law of identity is written "a = a" or "For all x: x = x", where a or x refer to a term rather than a proposition, and thus the law of identity is not used in propositional logic. It is that which is expressed by the equals sign "=", the notion of identity or equality.

Continental

Martin Heidegger held a talk in 1957 entitled "Der Satz der Identität", where he links the law of identity "A=A" to the Parmenides' fragment "to gar auto estin noien te kai einai" (....for the same thing can be thought and can exist). Heidegger thus understands identity starting from the relationship of Thinking and Being, and from the belonging-together of Thinking and Being. 
Gilles Deleuze wrote that "Difference and Repetition" is prior to any concept of identity.

Modern logic 

In first-order logic, identity (or equality) is represented as a two-place predicate, or relation, =. Identity is a relation on individuals. It is not a relation between propositions, and is not concerned with the meaning of propositions, nor with equivocation. In logic, there are various different ways identity can be handled. In first-order logic with identity, identity is treated as a logical constant and its axioms are part of the logic itself. Under this convention, the law of identity is a logical truth. 

In first-order logic without identity, identity is treated as an interpretable predicate and its axioms are supplied by the theory. This allows a broader equivalence relation to be used that may allow a = b to be satisfied by distinct individuals a and b. Under this convention, a model is said to be normal when no distinct individuals a and b satisfy a = b. 

One example of a logic that rejects or restricts the law of identity in this way is Schrödinger logic.

See also
 Rectification of names

References

External links

Identity (philosophy)
Logic